= Seeds of Corruption =

1973 novel by Sabri Moussa

Seeds of Corruption (Novel)
- Author: Sabri Moussa
- Translator: Mona N. Mikhail
- Language: AR/EN (Trans.)
- Published: 1973
- Publisher: Interlink Publishing Group
- Pages: 169

Seeds of Corruption is a 1973 novel by the Egyptian writer Sabri Moussa. Critics considered the novel to be a gateway into modernism for 1960s and 1970s literature. The novel was selected among the 100 best Arabic novels list.

== Summary ==
The novel revolves around an Italian traveler called Nicola. Nicola comes to the Egyptian desert, gets amazed by it, and decides to settle there until the end of his life.

The novel's value resides in its being the first Egyptian literary work taking place fully in the desert, especially after a desert of choosing the city or countryside as the two settings for literary works. The novel also focuses on the lives of Bedouins instead of fishers and coastal life. The modernism in the novel stems from the way the novel connects the events with the setting, and how the setting is so relevant that it feels as if it is its own independent character. Moussa does this through in-depth descriptions of the setting.

== Analysis ==
The novel describes the mountain's ancientness. The researcher notices that this establishes two goals in the context of the text. Firstly, this place is as old as Earth, and the effects of thousands of years can only result in jags and concavities, whereas a few years of colonialism and greed in this mountain resulted in holes thousands of meters deep – as a result of explosive chemicals – presenting a contradictory idea between nature's subtle effect over thousands of years and human's destructive effects over a few years.

The novel describes Nicola as stateless. This description is paradoxical, as Nicola is not root-less; he is originally from a town in the Caucasus, but he settled in Turkey where his father works before settling in Italy himself where he worked and got married and had his daughter. He comes to Jabal Darhīb initially for mining purposes, to look for precious metals, particularly talc. Then, he gets enchanted by the place and its many legends, and its tribes whose origins goes back to the Caucasus. Therefore, the term “stateless” becomes a confirmation of Nicola's daily self-torture as he wants to purify himself until he becomes a rock and a landmark in the place, just like his great-grandfather (Coca Lonca) was able to become a rock and make his own legend.

Sabri Moussa uses empty space in the novel to refer to the place that the panoramic eye looks at to look for something specific. For example, when talking about their attempts to find Nicola and his grandchild, the narrator talks about how each of them could sense Nicola in that desert emptiness. In this context, the members of Al-Bushariya tribe, the natives of this place, appear, unwelcoming of these foreigners that consist of two groups: Foreigners coming for mining purposes and Egyptian investors. Both of these groups share the same goal and have one thing in common, and it is that they consider this place devoid of people or tribes, living in it for hundreds, or perhaps thousands of years. Therefore, considering it a place that no one belongs to, allowing themselves to take over it with negotiations with the authorities who look at the natives as mere minorities in the country's margins, without value or right to the place or to belong to it.
